A Whole New World is the fifth studio album released by British-Australian singer-songwriter Peter Andre, in collaboration with his then wife Katie Price.

Background
After being dropped from East West Records, Andre began recording songs with his then current wife, Katie Price, in their private recording studio in Surrey. Andre planned to keep the songs as private recordings, and had decided to change his focus from the music industry to his family. However, several of the songs were leaked onto the internet in 2006. Andre was later contacted by Absolute Marketing and Universal Music Group, who perceived an interest in releasing the recordings as an album. The album was officially released on 27 November 2006. The album was certified Gold in the UK, awarded for 100,000 copies of the album being shipped to stores. Only the title track was released as a single from the album, on 11 December 2006. Due to poor sales and no promotion, Andre and Price were dropped from the label.

The album has since gained some attention for the many five-star reviews on its Amazon.co.uk listing that, although ostensibly positive in the extreme, are largely written in a tongue-in-cheek style. Some praise the album for its "medical" applications, satirically claiming it has cured such conditions as asthma and constipation.

Track listing
 "A Whole New World" – 4:35
 "The Best Things in Life Are Free" – 4:12
 "Endless Love" – 4:27
 "Islands in the Stream" – 4:09
 "Tonight I Celebrate My Love for You" – 3:41
 "Cherish" – 4:05
 "The Two of Us" – 4:01
 "I Come Down" – 3:59
 "Don't Go Breaking My Heart" – 4:23
 "To Die For" – 3:54
 "I've Had The Time of My Life" – 4:37
 "Lullaby" – 3:03

Charts

Weekly charts

Year-end charts

Certifications

References

2006 albums
Vocal duet albums
Katie Price albums
Peter Andre albums